Newman-O's are a type of cream-filled (usually chocolate) sandwich cookie. They were made and distributed by Newman's Own, and come in many flavors such as original, hint-o-mint, chocolate crème, peanut butter, and vanilla. They are one of many sandwich cookie replicas of the original Hydrox cookie, and their more popular replica Oreo.

The cookies are organic and do not contain any partially hydrogenated oils or trans fatty acids. They are also kosher.

They are popular among those who suffer from lactose intolerance since the cookies contain no dairy products; they are also a common sweet food for vegans because of their lack of animal ingredients. The company also offers wheat-free cookies. The cookies are also free of high fructose corn syrup.

The Newman-O's theme song features the following lyrics:
"You might, m'lady, tweak my nose.You could, m'lord, step on my toes.
But Heaven help those poor bozos,who try to filch my Newman-O's."The theme song was sometimes played on Newman's Own commercials in the 1990s, in the background of a boy eating them.

See also 
 Oreo
 Hydrox
 Domino

References 

Brand name cookies